Russell Crowe is a New Zealand actor, filmmaker, musician and singer. He gained international attention for his role as Roman General Maximus Decimus Meridius in the 2000 epic historical film Gladiator, for which he won an Academy Award for Best Actor. Crowe's other performances include tobacco firm whistle-blower Jeffrey Wigand in the drama film The Insider (1999) and mathematician John Forbes Nash Jr. in the biopic A Beautiful Mind (2001). He has also starred in films Romper Stomper with Daniel Pollock (1992), The Quick and the Dead with Sharon Stone (1995), L.A. Confidential with Guy Pearce (1997), Master and Commander: The Far Side of the World with Paul Bettany (2003), Cinderella Man with Renée Zellweger (2005), 3:10 to Yuma with Christian Bale (2007), American Gangster with Denzel Washington (2007), State of Play with Ben Affleck (2009), and Robin Hood with Cate Blanchett (2010).

Crowe later starred in the 2012 musical drama Les Misérables, as Jor-El in the 2013 superhero epic Man of Steel, the 2014 biblical fantasy drama Noah, and the 2016 action comedy The Nice Guys. In 2014, he made his directorial debut with the drama The Water Diviner, in which he also starred. He has earned various accolades, including a star on the Hollywood Walk of Fame, two Golden Globe Awards, a British Academy Film Award, and an Academy Award out of three consecutive nominations (1999, 2000, and 2001).

Film

Television

References

External links 
 

Male actor filmographies
Australian filmographies